Trimbakeshwar Range is a mountain range in the Western Ghats of Maharashtra entirely situated in Nashik District. The range lies 30 km southwest to the district headquarters Nashik. The saddle shaped depression of the Brahmagiri mountain protects Trimbak, a town considered holy by Hindus Devotees throng to this town to pay visit to the sacred Trimbakeshwar Shiva Temple. The northern face of the range is the birthplace of India's 2nd longest river Godavari.The southern face of these hills are covered with dense forests and thus form a catchment area for the Upper Vaitarna Reservoir, the most important and reliable source of potable water supply to the metropolitan city of Mumbai.
Trimbakeshwar range also contain the Anjaneri hills though a minority of authors consider the latter to be a distinct range and often prefer to use the synonym Trimbak-Anjaneri to avoid disambiguation.

Geography
The range lies on a west to east axis southwest of Nashik resting on the western edge of the Deccan Plateau. The range consists of flood basalt and lies within the region which is known as the Deccan Traps. The range can be accessed from the city via NH848.

List of peaks

References

Nashik district